Simeon Draper (January 19, 1806 - November 6, 1866) was a prominent merchant and politician in New York City.  During the American Civil War, he was the federal government's agent for receiving captured cotton from the Confederate States of America and selling it to benefit the Union war effort.

A native of Brookfield, Massachusetts, Draper clerked for a Boston merchant before moving to New York City to begin his own business career.  A successful merchant, he became wealthy enough to broaden his holdings, which grew to include real estate, insurance, and banking.

A Whig in politics, and later a Republican, Draper served on the Whig state committee several times in the 1840s and 1850s; after becoming a Republican following the party's founding in the mid-1850s, he served as chairman of the New York Republican State Committee from 1860 to 1862.

During the American Civil War, Draper received a high-paying patronage appointment as Collector of the Port of New York.  He was also appointed as an agent of the federal government responsible to receive, store, and dispose of cotton captured in the Confederate States of America.  The results of a post-war investigation indicated that Draper used this post to recover from financial setbacks he had during the Panic of 1857 by diverting some of the proceeds of the sale of captured cotton to his personal use.

Draper died in Whitestone, Queens County, New York in 1866, and was buried at Trinity Church Cemetery in Manhattan.

Early life
Draper was born in Brookfield, Massachusetts on January 19, 1806, the eighth son and 12th child of Captain Simeon Draper (1765–1848), and his first wife, Mary "Polly" Bemis, the daughter of Col. Benjamin Bemis.  He was a merchant's clerk in Boston, Massachusetts before coming to New York City where he settled as a merchant.  His business interests later expanded to include real estate investment, development, and auctions, as well as insurance and investment banking.

Political career
Draper was a friend of Daniel Webster, William H. Seward, Thurlow Weed, and a member of the Whig Party. He began his political career in the 1840s when he was appointed a member of the Board of Ten Governors, then in charge of New York City charities.  When the law creating the board was repealed, Draper served as Commissioner of Public Charities and Correction. In the 1850s, Draper was Superintendent of Canal Repairs on the Cayuga and Seneca Canal.  He served as a member of the Whig state central committee several times in the 1840s and 1850s, and became a Republican when the party was founded in 1854.  In 1856, he was a candidate for the Republican nomination for governor, but John A. King was selected and went on to win the general election.  He was one of the original Police Commissioners of the New York Metropolitan Police District when the board was established on April 16, 1857, and was chosen to serve as the board's president.  Draper resigned before the end of his term after complaining that his fellow commissioners were making police department appointments based on political considerations and without consulting him.

Civil War
From 1860 to 1862, Draper was the chairman of the state Republican party.  From September 1862 to April 1863, Draper served during the American Civil War as Provost Marshal General of the United States Department of War. In this civilian position, Draper oversaw special provost marshals at the local level who were responsible for arresting deserters, enrolling draftees, and enlisting volunteers. Draper resigned after passage of a new law reorganizing the Provost Marshal's office and appointing deputies by Congressional district.

Draper was also an agent of the federal government with wartime responsibility for receiving cotton captured in the Confederate states, storing it, and then selling it on the government's behalf.  According to allegations in a post-war Congressional investigation, Draper, who had been bankrupted by business reverses during the Panic of 1857, did not provide accurate reports on the types and amounts of cotton he sold, enabling him to divert some of the proceeds to his personal use.  As a result, he was supposedly able to pay off his debts and leave a sizable estate at his death.

From September 1864 to August 1865, Draper was Collector of the Port of New York from September 1864 to August 1865. In a story recounted by David Davis, Draper obtained the collector's post after paying $20,000 (about $320,000 in 2018) to Mary Todd Lincoln so that she would persuade her husband to appoint him to this lucrative post.  Draper and Mrs. Lincoln both denied Davis's claim, and nothing was ever proved against them.

Death
Draper died in Whitestone, Queens County, New York on November 6, 1866.  He was interred in the Draper family vault at Trinity Church Cemetery in Manhattan.

Family
Simeon Draper was a descendant of early Massachusetts settler James Draper.

On October 30, 1834, he married Frances S. Haggerty Draper, daughter of John Haggerty, with whom he had five children: Marie (b. 1835); Fanny (b. 1837); John Haggerty (1839-1890); Julian (b. 1841, died as an infant); and Henry (1843-1898).

William B. Draper was his brother. Notable descendants include great-grandsons William Draper Lewis and Francis Draper Lewis.

References

Sources

Books

Newspapers

Internet

19th-century American businesspeople
People from West Springfield, Massachusetts
1804 births
1866 deaths
Collectors of the Port of New York
New York (state) Whigs
New York (state) Republicans
Burials at Trinity Church Cemetery
People from Brookfield, Massachusetts